Félix Flechas (born 17 September 1954) is a Puerto Rican alpine skier. He competed in two events at the 1988 Winter Olympics.

References

1954 births
Living people
Puerto Rican male alpine skiers
Olympic alpine skiers of Puerto Rico
Alpine skiers at the 1988 Winter Olympics
Place of birth missing (living people)